Poroina Mare is a commune located in Mehedinți County, Oltenia, Romania. It is composed of four villages: Fântânile Negre, Poroina Mare, Stignița and Șipotu.

Natives
 Petre Cameniță

References

Communes in Mehedinți County
Localities in Oltenia